Nove is an urban-type settlement in Kropyvnytskyi Raion of Kirovohrad Oblast in Ukraine. Nove belongs to Kropyvnytskyi urban hromada, one of the hromadas of Ukraine. Population: 

Until 18 July 2020, Nove belonged to Kropyvnytskyi Municipality. The municipality was abolished as an administrative unit in July 2020 as part of the administrative reform of Ukraine, which reduced the number of raions of Kirovohrad Oblast to four. The area of Kropyvnytskyi Municipality was merged into Kropyvnytskyi Raion.

Economy

Transportation
Lelekivka railway station is located in the settlement. It is on the railway connecting Kropyvnytskyi and Novoukrainka, there is infrequent passenger traffic.

The settlement has access to highways M12 which connects Kropyvnytskyi with Uman and M13 connecting Kropyvnitskyi with the border with the Republic of Moldova, where it continues to Chișinău.

References

Urban-type settlements in Kropyvnytskyi Raion